The Arjuna Award, officially known as Arjuna Awards for Outstanding Performance in Sports and Games is a sports honour of Republic of India. It is awarded annually by the Ministry of Youth Affairs and Sports. Before the introduction of the Rajiv Gandhi Khel Ratna in 1991–1992, the Arjuna Award was the highest sporting honour of India. , the award comprises "a bronze statuette of Arjuna, certificate, ceremonial dress, and a cash prize of ".

Name
The award is named after Arjuna, a character from the Sanskrit epic Mahabharata of ancient India. He is one of the Pandavas, depicted as a skilled archer, winning the hand of Draupadi in marriage, and, in the Kurukshetra War, Lord Krishna becomes his charioteer, teaching him the sacred knowledge of Gita. In Hindu mythology, he has been seen as a symbol of hard work, dedication and concentration.

History
Instituted in 1961 to honour the outstanding sportspersons of the country, the award over the years has undergone a number of expansions, reviews, and rationalizations. The award was expanded to include all the recognised disciplines in 1977, has introduced indigenous games and physically handicapped categories in 1995 and introduced a lifetime contribution category in 1995 leading to creation of a separate Dhyan Chand Award in 2002. The latest revision in 2018 stipulates that the award is given only to the disciplines included in the events like Olympic Games, Paralympic Games, Asian Games, Commonwealth Games, World Championship and World Cup along with Cricket, Indigenous Games, and Parasports. It also recommends giving only fifteen awards in a year, relaxing in case of excellent performance in major multi-sport events, team sports, across gender and giving away of at least one award to physically challenged category.

The nominations for the award are received from all government recognised National Sports Federations, the Indian Olympic Association, the Sports Authority of India (SAI), the Sports Promotion and Control Boards, the state and the union territory governments and the Rajiv Gandhi Khel Ratna, Arjuna, Dhyan Chand and Dronacharya awardees of the previous years. The recipients are selected by a committee constituted by the Ministry and are honoured for their "good performance in the field of sports over a period of four years" at international level and for having shown "qualities of leadership, sportsmanship and a sense of discipline".

Recipients
A total of 147 awards were presented in the 1980s thirteen in 1980–1981, followed by sixteen in 1981, twenty in 1982, nineteen in 1983, fifteen in 1984, nineteen in 1985, thirteen in 1986, fifteen in 1987, five in 1988 and twelve in 1989. Individuals from thirty-three different sports were awarded, which includes nineteen from athletics, ten each from hockey and cricket, seven each from boxing, mountaineering and weightlifting, six each from chess, wrestling and yachting, five each from kho kho, shooting, swimming, table tennis and volleyball, four each from billiards & snooker, equestrian, football and kabaddi, three each from golf, three each from adventure sports, badminton and basketball, two each from archery, golf, gymnastics, lawn tennis, polo, powerlifting and rowing, and one each from ball badminton, bodybuilding, cycling, roller skating and squash. 

Amongst the notable winners were P. T. Usha (awarded in 1983), nicknamed "queen of track and field". In 1984 Los Angeles Olympics she missed the bronze medal by one-hundredth of a second in 400 metres hurdles, and in 1985 Asian Athletics Championships held in Indonesia, she won five gold medals and a bronze medal. Bachendri Pal (awarded in 1984), became the first Indian woman to climb Mount Everest in 1984, after which she led a number of expeditions including the 1993 Indo-Nepalese Women's Everest Expedition. Viswanathan Anand (awarded in 1985) became India's first-ever chess grandmaster in 1988. He would go on to become the FIDE World Chess Championship in 2000 and subsequently undisputed World Chess Champion four times in 2007, 2008, 2010, and 2012. Geet Sethi (awarded in 1985) was a professional English billiards player. He dominated the sport for much of 1990s, becoming the world champion eight times and setting two world records.

List of Recipients

Explanatory notes

Reference

External links
Official website

 
Indian sports trophies and awards
Lists of Indian award winners